Tibor Pardi (5 December 1967 – 28 February 2007) was a Hungarian water polo player. He competed in the men's tournament at the 1988 Summer Olympics.

References

1967 births
2007 deaths
Hungarian male water polo players
Olympic water polo players of Hungary
Water polo players at the 1988 Summer Olympics
Water polo players from Budapest